Rufus King Jordan (November 28, 1863 - 26 Apr 1942) was an American politician and industrialist from Maine. A Democrat, Jordan was Mayor of Westbrook, Maine from 1905 to 1906. He also served two terms in the Maine House of Representatives.

Personal
Jordan was born and raised in Westbrook, where he received a preliminary education at local public schools. He dropped out of school and was employed by L.S. Stevenson, where he learned civil engineering. After six years with Stevenson, Jordan purchased a foundry from G.H. Raymond.

References

1863 births
1942 deaths
Mayors of Westbrook, Maine
Democratic Party members of the Maine House of Representatives
Businesspeople from Maine